The 2014 K League Challenge was the second season of the K League Challenge, the second tier South Korean professional league for association football clubs, since its establishment in 2013. From the 2014 season, a top place team was promoted to the K League Classic and the promotion play-offs among three clubs ranked between 2nd and 4th took place after the regular season ends.

Teams
Sangju Sangmu, the champions of the 2013 K League Challenge, was promoted to 2014 K League Classic, then Gangwon FC, Daegu FC and Daejeon Citizen were relegated from the top tier. A total of 10 teams contested the league.

Participating clubs

Stadiums 
Primary venues used in the K League Challenge:

Personnel and kits

Note: Flags indicate national team as has been defined under FIFA eligibility rules. Players may hold more than one non-FIFA nationality.

Foreign players
Restricting the number of foreign players strictly to four per team, including a slot for a player from AFC countries. A team could use four foreign players on the field each game.

League table

Positions by matchday

Round 1–18

Round 19–36

Results

Matches 1–18

Matches 19–36

Promotion-Relegation Playoffs
Promotion and relegation playoffs were held between 2nd and 4th placed clubs of 2014 K League Challenge and 11th club of the 2014 K League Classic.

Semi-Playoff

Playoff

Promotion-Relegation Playoffs

First leg

Second leg

''Gwangju FC secure promotion to the 2015 K League Classic season, 4–2 on aggregate.

Season statistics

Top scorers

Top assists

Attendance

Awards

The 2014 K League Awards was held on 1 December 2014.

K League Challenge Most Valuable Player
The K League Challenge Most Valuable Player award was won by  Adriano (Daejeon Citizen)

K League Challenge Top Scorer

The K League Challenge Top Scorer award was won by  Adriano (Daejeon Citizen)

K League Challenge Top Assistor

The K League Challenge Top Assistor award was won by  Choi Jin-ho (Gangwon FC)

K League Challenge Best XI

K League Challenge Manager of the Year
The K League Challenge Manager of the Year award was won by  Cho Jin-ho (Daejeon Citizen)

References

 2014 Season Review at K League Website

External links
Official K League Website 

K League Challenge seasons
K
K
K